Labre is a French surname. Notable people with the surname include:

 Benedict Joseph Labre (1748–1783), French mendicant
 Yvon Labre (born 1949), Canadian ice hockey player

See also
 LABRE, League of Brazilian Amateur Radio Transmitters

French-language surnames